"Crying" is a song written by Roy Orbison and Joe Melson for Orbison's third studio album of the same name (1962). Released in 1961, it was a number 2 hit in the US for Orbison and was covered in 1980 by Don McLean, whose version went to number 1 in the UK.

Composition 
Dave Marsh calls the song a "rock-bolero" with "blaring strings, hammered tympani, a ghostly chorus, the gentle strum of a guitar, [and] a hint of marimba". Billboard observes an "expressive reading" on the "country-flavored ballad." The personnel on the original recording included Orbison session regulars Bob Moore on bass; Floyd Cramer on piano; Buddy Harman on drums; and Boudleaux Bryant, Harold Bradley, and Scotty Moore on guitar.

Release and reception
The song was released as a 45-rpm single by Monument Records in mid-July 1961 and reached No. 1 on the United States Cashbox chart for a week on October 7, 1961.  On the rival Billboard Hot 100 it peaked at No. 2, where "Hit the Road Jack" by Ray Charles and his Orchestra kept it from No. 1.  Despite not reaching the summit in the latter publication, Billboard ranked the record as the No. 4 song of 1961.

In 2002, "Crying" was honored with a Grammy Hall of Fame Award. In 2010, Rolling Stone ranked it 69th on their list of the "500 greatest songs of all time".

Charts

Weekly charts

Year-end charts

Don McLean version

Don McLean's recording of the song went to No. 5 on the US Billboard Hot 100 in early 1981. His version of "Crying" also reached No. 2 adult contemporary and No. 6 Country.  It fared even better in the UK, where it reached No. 1 in 1980, spending three weeks atop the UK Singles Chart. McLean issued an album in 1981; however, "Crying" was taken from his 1978 album, Chain Lightning.  It became his second biggest hit in America.

Charts

Weekly charts

Year-end charts

Sales and certifications

Roy Orbison and k.d. lang version

Orbison rerecorded the song as a duet with k.d. lang as part of the soundtrack for the motion picture Hiding Out and released it as a single in 1987. Their collaboration won the Grammy Award for Best Country Collaboration with Vocals. It reached No. 2 in Lang's native Canada but was a minor US chart hit for the pair, peaking at No. 28 on the Billboard Adult Contemporary chart and No. 42 on the Hot Country Singles chart. It was a more substantial hit in the United Kingdom and Ireland in 1992, reaching No. 13 on the UK Singles Chart and No. 9 on the Irish Singles Chart. In 1993, the song re-charted on the US Adult Contemporary chart, peaking at No. 40.

Track listings
7-inch and cassette single (1987, 1992)
 "Crying" (with k.d. lang) – 3:48
 "Falling" – 2:22

UK CD1 and Australian CD single (1992)
 "Crying" (with k.d. lang)
 "Falling"
 "Oh, Pretty Woman"
 "She's a Mystery to Me"

UK CD2 (1992)
 "Crying" (with k.d. lang)
 "Falling"
 "Only the Lonely"
 "It's Over"

Charts

Weekly charts

Year-end charts

Release history

Notable cover versions
 A version by Jay and the Americans reached No. 25 in the US in 1966.
 Three other cover versions made country music charts over time. Charting with the song were:
 Del Shannon (1964)
 Arlene Harden (No. 28 in 1970),
 Ronnie Milsap (No. 79 in 1976)
 Stephanie Winslow (No. 14 in 1980 we).
 Rebekah Del Rio performed an a cappella Spanish language version of the song entitled "Llorando" in the 2001 David Lynch film Mulholland Drive.
 Waylon Jennings (1964)

Appearances in film, television and other media

 US presidential candidate Mitt Romney mentioned this song among his top 10 songs of all time in March 2012.
 In 2011, "Crying" was featured in the American comedy-drama film 50/50.
 "Crying" was featured in an episode of Only Fools and Horses. The episode "Stage Fright" featured Raquel and a guest character (Tony Angelino, played by Philip Pope) singing this song at a function. Angelino had a rhotacism, causing him to pronounce his Rs incorrectly.
 "Crying" is featured near the start of the first of the Australian telemovie trilogy Small Claims starring Rebecca Gibney and Claudia Karvan.
 "Crying" was featured in the 1997 dystopian art movie Gummo. After huffing glue, Tummler remarks that his transgender sibling used to sing "Crying". Tummler then proceeds to weakly sing parts of the song. The original version of the song is used during the last scenes of the movie.
 The song is featured in the 1999 film Paperback Hero, sung by Hugh Jackman and Claudia Karvan.
 "Llorando" was featured in a famous scene in Mulholland Drive and during the closing scenes of Prison Break in season 3.
 In Ally McBeal, season 2 episode 6 "Worlds Without Love", "Crying" is sung by Vonda Shepard.
 In Sports Night, season 2, episode 14 ("And the Crowd Goes Wild"), Casey McCall wears sunglasses during the course of a day following an eye exam. His colleagues ridicule him for this, one of them saying, "Hit the high note in 'Crying' and I'll be impressed," in reference to Orbison and his trademark sunglasses.
 In Castle Rock, Season 1, episode 4 ("The Box"), the song plays over character Dennis Zalewski's shooting rampage through Shawshank Prison.
 In AMC's The Walking Dead, "Crying" is used to psychologically break down Daryl Dixon in the Season 7 Episode, The Cell (The Walking Dead).
 In Bates Motel, "Crying" is played over the end scene in Season 5 Episode 6, Marion (Bates Motel).
 In Mindhunter, "Crying" (Don McLean version) is played in episode 1, season 1.

References

External links
 "Crying" at Allmusic

1960s ballads
1961 singles
1980 singles
1987 singles
1992 singles
Country ballads
Monument Records singles
Virgin Records singles
Songs written by Roy Orbison
Songs written by Joe Melson
Roy Orbison songs
K.d. lang songs
Billy Joe Royal songs
Don McLean songs
Jay and the Americans songs
Arlene Harden songs
Ronnie Milsap songs
Stephanie Winslow songs
Glen Campbell songs
La India songs
Cashbox number-one singles
RPM Country Tracks number-one singles of the year
UK Singles Chart number-one singles
Grammy Hall of Fame Award recipients
Rock ballads
Torch songs
Male–female vocal duets
Song recordings produced by Fred Foster
Song recordings produced by Don Was
Song recordings produced by Pete Anderson
1961 songs
Millennium Records singles
Songs about loneliness